Edgeworthstown railway station serves the town of Edgeworthstown (Mostrim) in County Longford, Ireland.

Edgeworthstown station is served by national rail company Iarnród Éireann's Dublin to Sligo InterCity service and Dublin to Longford Western Commuter service.

History
The station opened on 8 November 1855.

It was formerly called "Mostrim railway station", from an anglicisation of the town's Irish language name, but this fell out of official usage by the 1990s.

Ticketing

Cheaper tickets can be purchased in advance, online at http://www.irishrail.ie. These can be collected from one of the two ticket vending machines at the station entrance. Tickets may also be purchased at full price before departure from these machines, or from the booking office if it is open.

See also
 List of railway stations in Ireland

References

External links

Irish Rail Edgeworthstown Station Website

Iarnród Éireann stations in County Longford
Railway stations in County Longford
Railway stations opened in 1855
1855 establishments in Ireland
Railway stations in the Republic of Ireland opened in the 19th century